Cousin Bette (French: La cousine Bette) is a 1928 French silent historical drama film directed by Max de Rieux and starring Germaine Rouer, Henri Baudin and Alice Tissot. It is based on the 1846 novel Cousin Bette by Honoré de Balzac.

The film's sets were designed by the art director Claude Dauphin.

Cast
 Germaine Rouer as Valérie Marneffe 
 Henri Baudin as Baron Hulot 
 Alice Tissot as Elisabeth ' Lisbeth ' Fisher, la cousine Bette 
 Charles Lamy as Marneffe 
 François Rozet as Le comte Wenceslas Steinbock 
 Suzy Pierson as Josepha 
 Jane Huteau as Jenny Cadine 
 Léon Guillot de Saix as Claude Vignon 
 Mansuelle as Célestin Crevel 
 Andrée Brabant as La comtesse Hortense Steinbock 
 Maria Carli as Adeline, baronne Hulot d'Ervy Hulot 
 Nell Haroun as Le baron Montejanes

References

Bibliography
 Goble, Alan. The Complete Index to Literary Sources in Film. Walter de Gruyter, 1999.

External links

1928 films
Films set in the 19th century
Films directed by Max de Rieux
French silent feature films
1920s historical drama films
French historical drama films
1928 drama films
Silent historical drama films
1920s French films
1920s French-language films